In the 1875 Iowa State Senate elections, Iowa voters elected state senators to serve in the sixteenth Iowa General Assembly. Elections were held in 30 of the state senate's 50 districts. State senators serve four-year terms in the Iowa State Senate.

The general election took place on October 12, 1875.

Following the previous election, Republicans had control of the Iowa Senate with 36 seats to Democrats' 10 seats and four members of the Anti-Monopoly Party.

To claim control of the chamber from Republicans, the Democrats needed to net 16 Senate seats.

Republicans maintained control of the Iowa State Senate following the 1875 general election with the balance of power shifting to Republicans holding 40 seats and Democrats having 10 seats (a net gain of 4 seats for Republicans).

Summary of Results 
 Note: The holdover Senators not up for re-election are not listed on this table.

Source:

Detailed Results
NOTE: The Iowa Official Register does not contain detailed vote totals for state senate elections in 1875.

See also
 Elections in Iowa

External links
District boundaries for the Iowa Senate in 1875:
Iowa Senate Districts 1874-1877 map

References

Iowa Senate
Iowa
Iowa Senate elections